Madylin Anne-Michele Sweeten (born June 21, 1991) is an American actress, best known for her portrayal of Alexandra "Ally" Barone on the popular family sitcom Everybody Loves Raymond (1996–2005).

Personal life 
Sweeten was born in Brownwood, Brown County, Texas, the eldest of four children born to Timothy Lynn "Tim" Sweeten and Elizabeth Anne Gini (nee Millsap). She is the sister to Sawyer Sweeten.

Filmography

References

External links

American child actresses
American film actresses
American television actresses
Living people
People from Brownwood, Texas
Actresses from Texas
20th-century American actresses
21st-century American actresses
1991 births